United Airlines Flight 173 was a scheduled flight from John F. Kennedy International Airport in New York City to Portland International Airport in Portland, Oregon, with a scheduled stop in Denver, Colorado. On December 28, 1978, the aircraft flying this route ran out of fuel while troubleshooting a landing gear problem and crashed in a suburban Portland neighborhood near NE 157th Avenue and East Burnside Street, killing 10 on board.

Aircraft
The aircraft involved was a Douglas DC-8 60 series, powered by four Pratt & Whitney JT3D engines and delivered new to United Airlines in May 1968.   The aircraft was registered N8082U and was the 357th DC-8 built at the Long Beach assembly plant. The 60 series was a stretched version of the DC-8 that was  longer than the DC-8 series 10 through 50.

Flight
Flight 173 was piloted by an experienced cockpit crew, consisting of Captain Malburn "Buddy" McBroom (age 52), First Officer Roderick "Rod" Beebe (45), and Flight Engineer Forrest "Frosty" Mendenhall (41). McBroom had been with United Airlines for 27 years; he was one of the airline's most senior pilots with more than 27,600 hours of flight time, of which about 5,500 hours had been as a DC-8 captain. Beebe had been with the airline for 13 years and had logged more than 5,200 flight hours. Mendenhall had close to 3,900 flight hours and had been with the airline for 11 years. The first officer and flight engineer had over 2,500 hours of flying experience between them in the DC-8.

Flight 173 departed from Denver's Stapleton International Airport at 15:47 MST with 189 people on board—eight crew and 181 passengers. The estimated flight time was 2 hours and 26 minutes, and the planned arrival time in Portland was 17:13 PST, about 40 minutes after sunset. About  of fuel were on board the aircraft when it departed the gate in Denver.

As the landing gear was being lowered on approach to Portland International Airport, the crew felt an abnormal vibration and yaw of the aircraft and a lack of an indicator light showing the gear was lowered successfully. The crew requested a holding pattern to diagnose the problem, and for about the next hour, the crew flew over southeast Portland and worked to identify the status of the landing gear and prepare for a potential emergency landing. During this time, none of the three cockpit flight crew effectively monitored the fuel levels, which was exacerbated by the fact that the gear was down with the flaps at 15° during the entire hour-long holding maneuver, significantly increasing fuel burn rate. As a result, the number 3 and 4 engines flamed out.

As the crew prepared for a final approach for an emergency landing on runway 28L, they lost the number one and number two engines to a flameout, at which point a mayday was declared.

Of the crew members, two were killed, flight engineer Mendenhall and lead flight attendant Joan Wheeler; two sustained injuries classified by the National Transportation Safety Board (NTSB) as "serious", and four sustained injuries classified as "minor/none". Eight passengers died, and 21 had serious injuries.

The 304th Aerospace Rescue and Recovery Squadron of the Air Force Reserve, based at Portland International Airport, was conducting routine training flights in the area that evening. Airborne aircraft from this unit (HH-1H Huey helicopters) were immediately diverted to the crash scene and proceeded to transport many of the survivors to local hospitals.

Crash investigation and report
The NTSB investigation revealed that, when the landing gear was lowered, a loud thump was heard. That unusual sound was accompanied by abnormal vibration and yaw of the aircraft. The right main landing gear retract cylinder assembly had failed due to corrosion, and that allowed the right gear to free fall. Although it was down and locked, the rapid and abnormal free fall of the gear damaged a microswitch so severely that it failed to complete the circuit to the cockpit green light that tells the pilots that gear is down and locked. Those unusual indications (loud noise, vibration, yaw, and no green light) led the captain to abort the landing, so they would have time to diagnose the problem and prepare the passengers for an emergency landing. While the decision to abort the landing was prudent, the accident occurred because the flight crew became so absorbed with diagnosing the problem that they failed to monitor their fuel state and calculate a time when they needed to return to land or risk fuel exhaustion.

"The Safety Board believes that this accident exemplifies a recurring problem—a breakdown in cockpit management and teamwork during a situation involving malfunctions of aircraft systems in flight… Therefore, the Safety Board can only conclude that the flight crew failed to relate the fuel remaining and the rate of fuel flow to the time and distance from the airport, because their attention was directed almost entirely toward diagnosing the landing gear problem."

The NTSB determined the following probable cause:
The failure of the captain to monitor properly the aircraft's fuel state and to properly respond to the low fuel state and the crewmember's advisories regarding fuel state. This resulted in fuel exhaustion to all engines. His inattention resulted from preoccupation with a landing gear malfunction and preparations for a possible landing emergency.

The NTSB also determined the following contributing factor:
The failure of the other two flight crewmembers either to fully comprehend the criticality of the fuel state or to successfully communicate their concern to the captain

The fuel situation was known to be on the minds of the pilot and crew to some degree. Transcripts of cockpit recordings confirm this. Media reports at the time suggested that a not widely known problem existed with fuel state gauges on that model aircraft. The problem was not widely known in part because commercial aircraft are expected to fly with no less than a 45-minute reserve of fuel at all times. The gauge problem is addressed, though obliquely, in one of the safety board's recommendations:
Issue an Operations Alert Bulletin to have FAA inspectors assure that crew training stresses differences in fuel-quantity measuring instruments and that crews flying with the new system are made aware of the possibility of misinterpretation of gauge readings. (Class II--Priority Action) (A-79-32)

While the totalizer fuel gauge issue might have contributed to the crew's confusion toward the end of the flight, the NTSB report emphasized that the captain should never have allowed such a situation to develop in the first place. The NTSB made the following recommendation to specifically address that concern:
Issue an operations bulletin to all air carrier operations inspectors directing them to urge their assigned operators to ensure that their flightcrews are indoctrinated in principles of flight deck resource management, with particular emphasis on the merits of participative management for captains and assertiveness training for other cockpit crewmembers. (Class II, Priority Action) (X-79-17)

Aftermath
This last NTSB recommendation following the incident, addressing flight deck resource management problems, was the genesis for major changes in the way airline crewmembers were trained. This new type of training addressed behavioral management challenges such as poor crew coordination, loss of situational awareness, and judgment errors frequently observed in aviation accidents. It is credited with launching the crew resource management (CRM) revolution in airline training. Within weeks of the NTSB recommendation, NASA held a conference to bring government and industry experts together to examine the potential merits of this training.

United Airlines instituted the industry's first CRM for pilots in 1981. This program is now used throughout the world, prompting some to call the United 173 accident one of the most important in aviation history. The NTSB Air Safety Investigator who wrote the CRM recommendation was aviation psychologist Alan Diehl.

Assigned to investigate this accident, Diehl realized it was similar to several other major airline accidents including United Airlines Flight 2860, which occurred a little over a year before Flight 173 and under near identical circumstances; Eastern Air Lines Flight 401; and the Tenerife airport disaster. Diehl was familiar with the research being conducted at NASA’s Ames Research Center and believed these training concepts could reduce the likelihood of human error.

Held responsible for the accident, Captain McBroom lost his pilot's license and retired from United Airlines shortly afterwards. He spent his remaining years battling health problems related to injuries sustained in the crash, as well as lung and prostate cancers. Family members and passengers who spoke to McBroom at a 1998 reunion of crash survivors reported he was "a broken man" plagued by guilt over his role in the accident. He died on October 9, 2004 at age 77.

One of the surviving passengers, an eight-year-old in 1978, was awarded US$900,000 in damages from the airline by a Portland jury in 1984. She was injured and both of her parents were killed.

Published in February 2018, Crash Course by Julie Whipple focuses on the events of the night of the crash, the investigation, and aftermath of the crash.

In popular culture
 The events of Flight 173 were featured in "Focused on Failure" (also known as "Fatal Fixation"), a season-12 (2012) episode of the Canadian TV series Mayday (called Air Emergency in the US and Air Crash Investigation in the UK and elsewhere around the world).
 It is featured in season 2, episode 1, of the TV show Why Planes Crash, in an episode called "Crisis in the Sky".
 "One Against the Storm" By Stanley C. Mann 1980 ISBN 0938662007 Paperback Bailey/sullivan "About Joan Wheeler"

See also
 Aviation safety
 List of accidents and incidents involving commercial aircraft
 List of airline flights that required gliding

References
Notes

Further reading

External links
 Aviation Safety Network for United 173
 Accident details  at planecrashinfo.com
 Photos of N8082U at Airliners.net
  at AirDisaster.com
 
 Portland airliner crash in 1978 killed 10, but changed the way crews are trained - The Oregonian
 Location of accident at Google Maps 

Accidents and incidents involving the Douglas DC-8
Airliner accidents and incidents caused by fuel exhaustion
Airliner accidents and incidents caused by pilot error
Airliner accidents and incidents in Oregon
Aviation accidents and incidents in the United States in 1978
Disasters in Oregon
173
1978 in Portland, Oregon
Portland International Airport